Cadet College Skardu is a military high school located at Skardu, Gilgit-Baltistan, Pakistan.

The college was established in 2001 and is the first institution of its kind in the Gilgit-Baltistan. The college is funded by the Federal Government and is being administered by the Ministry of Kashmir and Gilgit-Baltistan Affairs.

Location
The campus of Cadet College Skardu is located in the center of Skardu valley next to the Skardu airport in Hotto town. Skardu is linked to Islamabad International Airport by a daily flight. It takes about forty five to sixty minutes to fly from Islamabad to Skardu.

Building
The foundation stone of the college was laid in 1994. Phase-I of the College has been completed at a cost of Rs.150 million. The College Campus, which includes  three hostels, accommodations for staff, academic block and planned civic facilities is spread over an area exceeding 1000 kanals (125 acres).

Houses
The college is divided into four houses.

Academics
Up to Secondary Level, the College provides uniform science education; the medium of instruction being English. At higher secondary level, the students are offered the following combinations in addition to compulsory subjects:
 Pre-Engineering:         Physics, Math and Chemistry.
 Pre-Medical:             Physics, Biology and Chemistry.

Achievements
When the pioneer batch appeared in SSC-I exam held under FBISE, the college got the highest CGPA among all institutions. Since then, it has maintained its position at the top. Although no individual student has ever topped the FBISE, the collective GPA has been highest every year, at both SSC and HSSC levels.

Principals
Following are the Principals of the College:

References

External links
Cadet College Skardu

Boarding schools in Pakistan
Schools in Gilgit-Baltistan
Cadet colleges in Pakistan
Universities and colleges in Gilgit-Baltistan